Hounet is a town and commune in Saïda Province in northwestern Algeria.

References

Communes of Saïda Province